Drahimek  is a village in the administrative district of Gmina Czaplinek, within Drawsko County, West Pomeranian Voivodeship, in north-western Poland.

The village has an approximate population of 30.

References

Drahimek